The Coast Range Ophiolite is an ophiolite of Middle to Late Jurassic age located in the California Coast Ranges. The form the basement of the extreme western margin of central and northern California. Exposures straddle the coast from Santa Barbara County up to San Francisco. The formation then trends inland up to the southern end of the Klamath Mountains.

The Coast Range ophiolite is arguably the most extensive ophiolite terrane in the United States, and is one of the most studied ophiolites in the North America.

Description
As indicated by the name, the ophiolite is defined by the presence of ultramafic rocks in the California Coast Ranges. Pillow lavas and oceanic basalts are among the most common rocks found within the formation. There are a number of exposures that straddle the ancient Mohorovičić discontinuity. Metamorphosed peridotite, in the form of a serpentine rock, is an indicator of the formation.

Distribution
In general, the ophiolite is exposed near the boundary between the sequences of rocks associated with the Coast Ranges, and rocks associated with the Great Valley Sequence. Where it is exposed, it generally underlies the various sedimentary rocks of the Great Valley Sequence, and may be coextensive with the contemporaneous (but slightly younger on average) Franciscan Assemblage, as would be expected by an observational application of the law of superposition. However, in many localities, the ultramafic rocks of the ophiolite can be found intruding or on top of the local country rock.

Origin and Tectonics
The Coast Range Ophiolite is characterized by obduction of oceanic crust onto land. Most of the rocks in the ophiolite were part of an accretionary wedge on the continental margin of Laurasia that was thrust onto land during the Jurassic through the influence of subduction. The exact origins of the rocks found in the ophiolite are a matter of debate; some geologists hypothesize that the rock primarily consists of mid-ocean lithosphere, while others assert different ideas related to island arc terranes associated with the Nevadan orogeny.

See also
Franciscan Assemblage
Point Sal State Beach - notable coastal exposure

References

Sources

Shervais, J. (n.d.). John W. Shervais: Research Projects - Ophiolites and Oceanic Crust. Retrieved September 6, 2014.

Ophiolites
Natural history of the California Coast Ranges
Ophiolite, Coast Range
Jurassic California
Middle Jurassic North America
Late Jurassic North America
Geologic formations of California
Geology of Monterey County, California
Geology of San Francisco
Geology of San Luis Obispo County, California
Geology of Santa Barbara County, California
Geology of California